Paola Velez (December 16, 1990) is a pastry chef and social justice activist from New York with Dominican heritage. She has worked for restaurants such as Milk Bar and Maydan in Washington, D.C., and she co-founded the organization Bakers Against Racism, as well as the donut pop-up shop Doña Dona in 2020.

Early life 
Velez grew up in The Bronx, New York. Her mother worked as an accountant for the Tex-Mex restaurant Mary Ann’s, which was owned by her mother’s cousin. She spent her childhood summers visiting her grandparents at their family home in the Dominican Republic. During her summers spent in the Dominican, she gained an appreciation for fresh produce, learning how to grow her own vegetables and fruit, and experiencing her grandmother’s home cooking.

Personal life 
Velez moved to Washington, D.C., in 2016 with her husband Hector Velez.

Career 
Velez was educated at Le Cordon Bleu in Orlando, Florida. After graduating in 2009, Velez studied for two years under Jacques Torres, an expert in the chocolate industry, at his factory in Brooklyn, New York. Velez moved from New York to Washington, D.C., in 2016 to work as a pastry chef at Milk Bar under chef Christina Tosi. With her gained experience, Velez transitioned to the position of Lead Pastry Cook at D.C. restaurant Arroz. She also functioned as the pastry chef for the Iron Gate Restaurant in 2018, and for Kith/Kin in 2019. Velez led the kitchen at Compass Rose and Michelin-starred Maydan while serving as the restaurant’s Executive Pastry Chef. After being furloughed during the Covid-19 pandemic, Velez joined Food&Wine Magazine to create the online streaming show, “Pastries with Paola, '' in which she shares recipes inspired by her Dominican heritage.

Activism 
In April of 2020 Velez co-founded the donut pop-up shop Doña Dona with Daniella Senior, founder of the Cuban cafe Colada Shop and the cocktail bar Serenata. Doña Dona raised around $1,100 that was donated to Ayunda D.C., an organization providing social and legal support for D.C. immigrants. After Doña Dona’s success, Velez co-founded Bakers Against Racism, a movement raising money for racial justice organization through baking, with pastry chef Willa Pelini. Velez also enlisted pastry chef Rob Rubba to create graphic designs to garner support for the organization over social media. Through their posts, the chefs were able to virtually gather bakers from across the country to create their own bake sales supporting racial justice advocacy. Since its launch in 2020, Bakers Against Racism has gained more than 3,000 participants in over 200 U.S. cities and raised over $2 million for organizations supporting Black Lives Matter. Bakers Against Racism has been recognized as the largest bake sale in history, raising millions of dollars.

Awards 
2021 Food & Wine Best New Chef

2021 InStyle 50 Women Making the World a Better Place

2021 Time Out Magazine Woman of the Year

2021 Washington Business Journal Diversity in Business Award Winner

2020 James Beard Foundation Rising Star Chef Finalist

2020 Esquire Pastry Chef of the Year Winner

2020 Washingtonian Magazine 100 Best Winner

References 

Pastry chefs
Alumni of Le Cordon Bleu
American women chefs
Chefs from New York City
People from the Bronx
American people of Dominican Republic descent
Year of birth missing (living people)
Living people
James Beard Foundation Award winners